Laid-Back Camp Season 2 Original Soundtrack is the soundtrack album of C-Station's Laid-Back Camp (2021). It was published in Japan by Mages on March 31, 2021.

Background
Akiyuki Tateyama served as the composer for the second season of Laid-Back Camp. He revealed that the soundtracks with tilde in the title were created through film scoring. For the soundtracks used in the Izu camping episodes, Tateyama incorporated South American folklore music, particularly from the Andes region, with the help of specialist musicians who played folk instruments such as quena and charango.

For the soundtracks used during the scenes between Rin Shima and her grandfather, Tateyama composed them with the inclusion of bassoon at the end of production when most of the soundtracks had been written. He cited the film Cinema Paradiso (1988) as the influence in composing those soundtracks. For Nadeshiko Kagamihara's theme, he used Royal piano to match her "bright and sparkling" personality. Her two soundtracks ("Nadeshiko" and "Nadeshiko's Thoughts") were built around the four musical notes (do, mi, so, do).

Participating musicians

Track listing
All music is composed by Tateyama, except where indicated. Excluded from the list are the audio dramas written by Mutsumi Itō, with Yumiri Hanamori and Nao Tōyama reprising their respective voice roles as Kagamihara and Shima.

Insert song
Eri Sasaki, in collaboration with Asaka and Tateyama under the group "Indoor Activity Circle", performed the insert song composed by Tateyama and played in the seventh episode titled . The song's lyrics was written by Asaka. It was originally posted on YouTube in May 2020 under the Camping at Home campaign, which was created to allow people enjoy the feeling of home camping through the series in the midst of COVID-19 pandemic.

Chart

References

Anime soundtracks
2021 soundtrack albums